Bradley Darrell Schumacher (born March 6, 1974) is an American former competition swimmer, water polo player, and Olympic gold medalist.  Schumacher is a two-time, two-sport Olympian.  He was a member of the winning relay teams at the 1996 Summer Olympics.  Four years later, he was a member of the U.S. men's water polo team at the 2000 Summer Olympics.

Schumacher's two gold medals came as a member of the U.S. men's swimming relay teams at the 1996 Olympics in Atlanta, Georgia: in the men's 4×100-meter freestyle relay and in the men's 4 × 200 m-meter freestyle relay.  Although Schumacher qualified for both swimming and water polo for the 2000 Olympic Games, he chose to compete only in water polo.  At the 2000 Olympics in Sydney, Australia, he helped the U.S. men's water polo team to a sixth-place finish. He was the top sprinter at the 2000 Olympics, with 20 sprints won.

Schumacher was the first American world champion in swimming and water polo since the 1904 Olympic Games.  In 1997, he earned a gold medal at the Pan-Pacific Games and his first national championship at the U.S. Spring Nationals.  In water polo, he has represented the U.S. at the FINA World Championships, FINA World Cup, World University Games and the Goodwill Games.

In 1998, Schumacher competed in World Championships in both sports and joined an elite group of aquatics stars that competed in both sports on the world-class level: Duke Khanamoku, Johnny Weissmuller, Bob Hughes, and Matt Biondi.

He was a swimming and water polo All-American in college for coach John Tanner at the University of the Pacific, in Stockton, California, where he completed bachelor's and master's degrees in business administration.

Schumacher is the co-founder of KAP7 International, Inc., a water polo equipment company, and he spends his time as the head coach of SET water polo club, a Southern California-based team that continues to rank among the top water polo clubs in the country.  His 18-and-under girls club team won the gold medal at the 2009 S&R Sport National Junior Olympics.

See also
 List of Olympic medalists in swimming (men)
 List of University of the Pacific (United States) people

References

External links
 
  Brad Schumacher – Maryland Swimming Hall of Fame profile

1974 births
Living people
American male freestyle swimmers
American male water polo players
Olympic gold medalists for the United States in swimming
Olympic water polo players of the United States
People from Bowie, Maryland
Swimmers at the 1996 Summer Olympics
University of the Pacific (United States) alumni
Water polo players at the 2000 Summer Olympics
Medalists at the 1996 Summer Olympics
Universiade medalists in swimming
Universiade gold medalists for the United States
Medalists at the 1995 Summer Universiade
American sports businesspeople
Ethnikos Piraeus Water Polo Club players